Horka nad Moravou is a municipality and village in Olomouc District in the Olomouc Region of the Czech Republic. It has about 2,600 inhabitants. It lies on the Morava River.

Notable people
Rudolf Doležal (1916–2002), sculptor

References

Villages in Olomouc District